

Whitacre may refer to:

Places
 Nether Whitacre
 Over Whitacre
 Whitacre, Virginia
 Whitacre Heath

Family name 
Whitacre is an English and Scottish toponymic surname, meaning the white acre
 Edward Whitacre, Jr.
 Eric Whitacre, American composer
 John J. Whitacre
 Mark Whitacre

Other uses
 Whitacre College of Engineering, Texas Tech University in Lubbock, Texas
 Whitacre Junction railway station, England
 Whitacre Tower, Dallas
 The Pumping Station, Whitacre Waterworks, Warwickshire

See also 
 Whitaker (disambiguation)
 Whittaker